A proton is a subatomic particle.

Proton may also refer to:

In chemistry 
 Proton, the hydron ion (notated )
 Proton, hydronium (also called hydroxonium) ion (notated )
 Proton-pump inhibitor, a group of drugs
 Proton conductor, an electrolyte
 Proton-coupled electron transfer, a chemical reaction mechanism
 Proton spectrum, the nuclear magnetic resonance spectrum of the 1H nucleus

In technology
 Ozone Proton, a French paraglider design
 Protei-5 Russian diver propulsion vehicle called a "Proton", Russian diver propulsion vehicle
 Proton (rocket family), Russian unmanned space vehicle design
 Proton satellite, Soviet satellite
 Proton, a make of rebreather breathing set made by Siebe Gorman
 Proton-K, a rocket
 Proton-M, a rocket
 Proton-transfer-reaction mass spectrometry, a technique to monitor volatile organic compounds online
 Original name of the BBC Micro microcomputer
 ProtonMail, an encrypted email service operated by the Swiss company Proton AG
 Proton (software), a Wine-based compatibility tool for Linux
 Proton, a graphical user interface for the browser Firefox, introduced in version 89, in June 2021
 ProtonVPN, a VPN service operated by the Swiss company Proton AG

In business
 Proton AG, a Swiss technology company offering privacy-focused online services.
 Proton (debit card), a discontinued electronic debit card from Belgium
 Proton Bank, an investment bank in Greece
 Proton Electronic a Taiwanese manufacturer of consumer audio and video equipment founded in 1964
 Proton (automobile), a Malaysian car producer
 Proton Radio, an internet electronic music station

Sport
 Proton F.C., football club in the Malaysian Premier League sponsored by the carmaker that existed between 1986 and 2009
 Proton Competition, a German auto racing team

Other uses
 USS Proton (AG-147), a US Navy tank landing ship
 Professor Proton, a fictional scientist
 Proton (band), an Australian rock band

See also
 Proto (disambiguation)